The Crystal Palace F.C. season 2010–11 was Crystal Palace's sixth consecutive season in the Championship. The previous season had seen Palace finish one place above the relegation zone, having been deducted ten points for going into administration. The CPFC 2010 consortium completed a takeover of the club in the close season and installed former Scotland manager George Burley as the club's new boss, with club legend Dougie Freedman continuing his role as assistant manager. However, after a poor start to the season, Burley was sacked on New Year's Day and Freedman named manager the following week. Under Freedman fortunes improved, and the club secured another season at Championship level shortly before the conclusion of the campaign.

Statistics 
Last updated on May 7, 2011.

|}

Club

Kits 
Supplier: Nike / Sponsor: GAC Logistics

Management 

 (July–May)

 (Oct-)

League table

Matches

Preseason

Results per matchday

Football League Championship

Football League Cup

Round 1

Round 2

FA Cup

Round 3

End-of-season awards

References

Notes

External links 
 Crystal Palace F.C. official website
 Crystal Palace F.C. on Soccerbase 

Crystal Palace F.C. seasons
Crystal Palace
Crystal Palace F.C. Season, 2010-11
Crystal Palace F.C. Season, 2010-11